Andytown was a town located in Broward County, Florida, United States at the intersection of U.S. 27 and I-75. It was demolished in 1979 in order to allow for the expansion of the Alligator Alley portion of Interstate 75. Andytown can be found on maps from the 1970s (and even 1980s, as it was years before they were updated). It remains today on some online map services. MSN's Maps service, for instance, returns a map for a search of Andytown. Google Maps similarly includes a place marker for it.

In its day, when SR 84 and US 27 were each two-lane roads, the intersection was controlled by a simple traffic light. At the southeast corner of that intersection sat a typical highway gas station-convenience store-restaurant. The restaurant was a very popular stopping point, especially for people who ventured into or returned from the Everglades.

Further remains of Andytown are located west of US 27 on Griffin Road; across the street from the cemetery is an FPL substation, named the Andytown Substation. Additionally, in nearby Davie, a bar called Andy's Lounge and Package displayed an old Andytown sign over their door, until the bar was demolished to make way for a Cumberland Farms. Near Andytown was another place called Jo-Mo City on U.S. 27.

References

External links
Ghost Towns of Florida
ghosttowns.com - Andytown

Buildings and structures demolished in 1979
Former populated places in Florida
Former populated places in Broward County, Florida